Rahmat Ma'ruf Rivai (also spelled Rachmat Rifai, born 1 December 1977), nicknamed Si Poci ("teapot"), is a former Indonesian professional footballer who played as a striker.

Honours

Sriwijaya
Piala Indonesia (1): 2010

Persipura Jayapura
Indonesia Super League (1): 2010–11

External links
 Profile in Liga Indonesia official website (archived) 

1977 births
Living people
Indonesian footballers
People from Ternate
Sportspeople from North Maluku
Persiter Ternate players
Persebaya Surabaya players
Sriwijaya F.C. players
Persipura Jayapura players
Liga 1 (Indonesia) players
Association football forwards